Valentin Thurn (born 1963, Stuttgart, Germany) is a German film maker, writer and director. He created the 2010 documentary Taste the Waste. He is also the co-founder of the International Federation of Environmental Journalists.

Early life
Valentin Thurn was born in 1963 in Stuttgart, Germany.

Career
The television documentaries that he has written and directed have received awards and have been aired for numerous national German broadcasters. He is the founder of the Cologne-based Thurn Film production company which began in 2003. His film Taste the Waste which was shown at UK Green Film Festival, City Screen, York on May 19, 2012, exposed how a significant percentage of food on its journey from the farm to the dinner table ends up in landfill. He interviewed everyone in the food chain which included food producers, consumers  to administrators and even politicians. It won Best Film of 2011 at Germany’s Atlantis Environment and Nature Film Festival. It also got the Documentary Film Award at EKOFILM International Film Festival in the Czech Republic. Another award in Germany that the film picked up was Environmental Media Prize by the German Environmental Organisation.

He founded the food sharing website Foodsharing.de, which was launched in January 2013. It was set up as a practical way to help to help solve food waste. The difference between this operation and food banks where people would have to prove they were needy, this one could be accessed by anybody. It was reported in November 2014 by the New York Times that in December that year, Foodsharing.de would incorporate Lebensmittelretten.de, a food sharing website which was founded by Raphael Fellmer.

He has been quoted as saying "the food industry played on consumers’ feelings to get them to buy."

Filmography
 10 Billion - What's on your plate? (10 Milliarden - Wie werden wir alle satt?) - 2015
 Die Essensretter - 2013  
 Taste the Waste - 2010
 Guillaume Depardieu - Es ist die Hölle! - 2010
 Ein Lotse fürs Leben  - 2009 
  The Whistleblower - Der aufsässige Staatsdiener - Ein Beamter packt aus - 2009
 Unschuldig im Knast - 2009
 Tod im Krankenhaus - 2008
 Gefundenes Fressen - 2008
 Samenspender unbekannt - 2008
 Impfen - Nur ein kleiner Nadelstich? - 2007
 Faustrecht hinter Gittern - 2007
 Mit meiner Tochter nicht - Frauen-Beschneidung in Europa - 2007
 Ich bin Al Kaida - Das Leben des Zacarias Moussaoui - 2006
 Mein Kind in deinem Bauch - 2006 
 Mein Vater will mich umbringen - Frauen auf der Flucht vor Ehrenmorden' - 2005 
 Bittere Pillen - 2005
 Ein Kind um jeden Preis - 2005
 Der Ruf nach dem Kind - 2004
 Oh diese Beckers - ein Familie im Rampenlicht Papa liebt einen Mann - 2003
 Der Trail Der Toros - 2003
 Die Story (TV Series documentary), Episode: Der Arzt und die verstrahlten Kinder von Basra'' (2003)

References

External links
 Thurnfilm
 Taste the Waste home

1963 births
Living people
Film people from Stuttgart